The Bunny Game  is a 2010 American low-budget avant-garde horror film co-created and co-written by Rodleen Getsic (who also stars in the film) and Adam Rehmeier.  Set in the desert, the film is about a prostitute who is abducted by a truck driver and subjected to extreme "games" of torture.

In the United States, the film had a limited theatrical release; it was later released on DVD and Blu-ray Disc on July 31, 2012 by Autonomy Pictures.

In the United Kingdom the British Board of Film Classification (BBFC) deemed the film 'unsuitable for classification' as doing so "would be inconsistent with the Guidelines, would risk potential harm within the terms of the Video Recordings Act, and would accordingly be unacceptable to the public."

Plot

Drug-addicted prostitute "Bunny" propositions a truck driver (who in flashbacks appears to be a serial killer). He kidnaps her and subjects her to extreme torture, inflicting brutal and extreme forms of physical and sexual abuse.

Cast 
 Rodleen Getsic as Bunny
 Jeff Renfro as Hog
 Gregg Gilmore as Jonas
 Drettie Page as Martyr

Production

Filming took place in October 2008 over 13 days. Shot in black and white, production costs totaled $13,000. Rehmeier has stated that the disturbing, visceral experience of watching the film was also related to Getsic’s personal experiences, as she “wanted to use the production as this cathartic process, to really purge some of the traumas she’s had.”<ref name= Rehmeier

Release
The film entered the 2011 PollyGrind Film Festival, in which it won several awards including "Best Cinematography", "Best Editing" and "Best Overall Individual Performance in a Film" (to Rodleen Getsic).

Reception

Critical reception for the film was mixed. Bloody Disgusting awarded the film a score of 2 / 4 stating, "The Bunny Game is a well shot and expertly edited work, but it's not a film in the conventional sense. It's more of a vicious visceral experience. Because of the style and the wholesale devotion of Getsic and Renfro, The Bunny Game is captivating, but ultimately not an experience worth having". Horror News.net gave the film a positive review, praising Rodleen Getsic's performance, and the film's editing.

The Bunny Game is listed at #37 in Complex magazine's 50 Most Disturbing Films of All Time and was banned in the United Kingdom by the British Board of Film Classification due to its graphic scenes of sexual and physical abuse. Lead actress Rodleen Getsic has claimed that The Muppet Movie influenced the film.

See also
List of black-and-white films produced since 1970
List of works rejected by the BBFC

References

External links

 
 
The Bunny Game at New York Times
 My Monsterpiece: An Art Film Cine-Excess

2011 films
2011 horror films
American horror films
American black-and-white films
Films originally rejected by the British Board of Film Classification
American serial killer films
Films set in deserts
2010s English-language films
2010s American films